Nops or NOPS may refer to:
 Nops (spider), a genus of spider of the family Caponiidae
 Gymnallabes nops, a species of catfish
 Jerry Nops (1875—1937), American baseball player
 Middlesbrough Ironopolis F.C.
 New Orleans Public Schools
 Nokian Palloseura

See also 
 NOP (disambiguation)